The Manyame River, also known as Panhame and formerly as Hunyani is a river located in Zimbabwe and Mozambique, and a tributary of the Zambezi River.

References

Rivers of Zimbabwe
Rivers of Mozambique
Geography of Mashonaland Central Province